Look Around may refer to:
 Look Around (Anthony Rapp album), a 2000 album, or its title track
 Look Around (Beat Happening album), a 2015 album, or its title track
 Look Around (Sergio Mendes album), a 1968 album, or its title track
 "Look Around" (song), from the Red Hot Chili Peppers' 2011 album I'm With You
 "Look Around", a song from Blues Traveler's 1994 album Four
 "Look Around", a song from Snoop Dogg's 2021 album From tha Streets 2 tha Suites

See also
 Look Around You, a British television series